Leo Da Vinci: Mission Mona Lisa is a 2018 Italian-Polish 3D computer-animated adventure film directed by Sergio Manfio.

Premise 
The film follows a fictionalised young Leonardo da Vinci, who goes on an adventure alongside three friends in order to find a sunken treasure to save crush Lisa from bankruptcy and a forced marriage.

Release and reception 
Leo Da Vinci was released theatrically in Italy on 11 January 2018. It had a worldwide gross of $2,594,932.

The film received generally negative reviews from critics, and on review aggregator Rotten Tomatoes the film holds an approval rating of  based on  critical reviews, indicating a "rotten" score.

References

External links 
 (in Italian)

Leo Da Vinci: Mission Mona Lisa at Cinematografo.it (Italian-language film database)